Donald Gary Durham (born March 21, 1949) is a former pitcher in Major League Baseball. He played for the St. Louis Cardinals and Texas Rangers.

Born in Yosemite, Kentucky, Durham attended Western Kentucky University and was drafted by the St. Louis Cardinals in the 7th round of the 1970 MLB Draft.

Durham holds the MLB record for most at-bats for a player who hit .500 or better in a career as he collected 7 hits in 14 career at-bats for an even .500 batting average.

References

External links

1949 births
Living people
Major League Baseball pitchers
Cedar Rapids Cardinals players
Modesto Reds players
Spokane Indians players
St. Louis Cardinals players
Texas Rangers players
Tulsa Oilers (baseball) players
Western Kentucky Hilltoppers baseball players
Baseball players from Kentucky
People from Casey County, Kentucky